Guy Mainwaring Morton (1896–1968) was a barrister and writer who wrote crime novels under his own name and the pen name of Peter Traill.

He married Clare, the daughter of the Hartlepool ship-owner M.H. Horsley, in 1923.

Selected publications
 Great Dust. Grayson & Grayson, 1932.
 The 3-7-9 Murder
 The Red Lady
 The Ragged Robin Murders
 The Perrin Murder Case
 Ashes of Murder
 Mystery at Hardacres
 The Forbidden Road
 The Angel
 The Scarlet Thumb-Print
 The Black Robe
 Under The Cherry Tree
 Rangy Pete
 King of the World, or, The Pommeray Case

References 

1896 births
1968 deaths
English barristers
English writers
20th-century English lawyers